Lyra2 is a password hashing scheme (PHS) that can also work as a key derivation function (KDF). It received a special recognition during the Password Hashing Competition in July 2015, which was won by Argon2. Besides being used for its original purposes, it is also in the core of proof-of-work algorithms such as Lyra2REv2, adopted by Vertcoin, MonaCoin, among other cryptocurrencies
Lyra2 was designed by Marcos A. Simplicio Jr., Leonardo C. Almeida, Ewerton R. Andrade, Paulo C. F. dos Santos, and Paulo S. L. M. Barreto from Escola Politécnica da Universidade de São Paulo. It is an improvement over Lyra, previously proposed by the same authors. Lyra2 preserves the security, efficiency and flexibility of its predecessor, including: (1) the ability to configure the desired amount of memory, processing time and parallelism to be used by the algorithm; and (2) the capacity of providing a high memory usage with a processing time similar to that obtained with scrypt. In addition, it brings the following improvements when compared to its predecessor:
 it allows a higher security level against attack venues involving time-memory trade-offs
 it allows legitimate users to benefit more effectively from the parallelism capabilities of their own platforms
 it includes tweaks for increasing the costs involved in the construction of dedicated hardware to attack the algorithm
 it balances resistance against side-channel threats and attacks relying on cheaper hence, slower storage devices
 Lyra2 is released under public domain, and provides two main extensions:
 Lyra2-δ, gives the user better control over the algorithm's bandwidth usage
 Lyra2p, takes advantage of parallelism capabilities on the legitimate user's platform
This algorithm enables parameterization in terms of:
 execution time (time cost )
 memory required (number of rows , and number of columns )
 degree of parallelism (number of threads )
 underlying permutation function (can be seen as the main cryptographic primitive)
 number of blocks used by the underlying permutation function (bitrate)
 number of rounds performed for the underlying permutation function
 number of bits to be used in rotations
 output length

Strengths 
The main strengths of the algorithm are:
High resistance against processing-memory tradeoffs: estimated processing costs of attacks with low memory usage involve a factor that grows exponentially with time cost due to recomputations
Memory and time costs can be decoupled, allowing the resources' usage to be fine-tuned
Fast due to use of reduced-round sponge function in the algorithm's core
Can provide outputs of any desired length, behaving as a key derivation function (KDF)
Design combines resistance to side-channel attacks (during the whole Setup phase) and to attacks involving cheap (hence, low-speed) memory devices, aiming to balance such conflicting requirements
Considers a wide range of configurations for protecting against attacking platforms while optimizing execution on legitimate platform, such as:
Support for parallelism, for multi-core platforms, without giving much advantage to GPU-based attacks
Capability of using different underlying sponge functions depending on the target platform (e.g., BLAKE2b for software implementations; Keccak for hardware implementations; BlaMka for additional resistance against hardware platforms; etc.)
Ability to raise the algorithm's memory bandwidth usage (note: the original specification is expected to max out the bandwidth in current machines, but feature may be useful for future hardware)

Design
As any PHS, Lyra2 takes as input a salt and a password, creating a pseudorandom output that can then be used as key material for cryptographic algorithms or as an authentication string.

Internally, the scheme's memory is organized as a matrix that is expected to remain in memory during the whole password hashing process: since its cells are iteratively read and written, discarding a cell for saving memory leads to the need of recomputing it whenever it is accessed once again, until the point it was last modified.

The construction and visitation of the matrix is done using a stateful combination of the absorbing, squeezing and duplexing operations of the underlying sponge (i.e., its internal state is never reset to zero), ensuring the sequential nature of the whole process.

Also, the number of times the matrix's cells are revisited after initialization is defined by the user, allowing Lyra2's execution time to be fine-tuned according to the target platform's resources.

Functions/symbols 
||				Concatenate two strings
^				Bitwise XOR
[+]				Wordwise add operation (i.e., ignoring carries between words)
%				Modulus
W				The target machine's word size (usually, 32 or 64)
omega				Number of bits to be used in rotations (recommended: a multiple of the machine's word size, W)
>>>				Right rotation
rho				Number of rounds for reduced squeeze or duplexing operations
blen				Sponge's block size in bytes 
H or H_i			Sponge with block size blen (in bytes) and underlying permutation f
H.absorb(input)			Sponge's absorb operation on input
H.squeeze(len)			Sponge's squeeze operation of len bytes
H.squeeze_{rho}(len)		Sponge's squeeze operation of len bytes using rho rounds of f
H.duplexing(input,len)		Sponge's duplexing operation on input, producing len bytes
H.duplexing_{rho}(input,len)	Sponge's duplexing operation on input, using rho rounds of f, producing len bytes
pad(string)			Pads a string to a multiple of blen bytes (padding rule: 10*1)
lsw(input)			The least significant word of input
len(string)			Length of a string, in bytes
syncThreads()			Synchronize parallel threads
swap(input1,input2)		Swap the value of two inputs
C				Number of columns on the memory matrix (usually, 64, 128, 256, 512 or 1024)
P				Degree of parallelism (P >= 1 and (m_cost/2) % P = 0)

Inputs

Algorithm without parallelism

Algorithm with parallelism 
for each i in [0..P]
	** Bootstrapping phase: Initializes the sponge's state and local variables
	
	# Byte representation of input parameters (others can be added)
	params =  outlen || len(password) || len(salt) || t_cost || m_cost || C || P || i

	# Initializes the sponge's state (after that, password can be overwritten)
	H_i.absorb( pad(password || salt || params) )

	# Initializes visitation step, window and first rows that will feed 
	gap = 1
	stp = 1
	wnd = 2
	sqrt = 2
	sync = 4
	j = i

	prev0 = 2
	rowP = 1
	prevP = 0

	** Setup phase: Initializes a (m_cost x C) memory matrix, its cells having blen-byte cells

	# Initializes M_i[0], M_i[1] and M_i[2]
	for col = 0 to C-1
		M_i[0][C-1-col] = H_i.squeeze_{rho}(blen)
	for col = 0 to C-1
		M_i[1][C-1-col] = H_i.duplexing_{rho}( M_i[0][col], blen)
	for col = 0 to C-1
		M_i[2][C-1-col] = H_i.duplexing_{rho}( M_i[1][col], blen)

	# Filling Loop: initializes remainder rows
	for row0 = 3 to ( (m_cost / P) - 1 )
		# Columns Loop: M_i[row0] is initialized and M_j[row1] is updated
		for col = 0 to C-1
			rand = H_i.duplexing_{rho}( M_j[rowP][col] [+] M_i[prev0][col] [+] M_j[prevP][col], blen)
			M_i[row0][C-1-col] = M_i[prev0][col] ^ rand
			M_j[rowP][col] = M_j[rowP][col] ^ ( rand >>> omega )

		# Rows to be revisited in next loop
		prev0 = row0
		prevP = rowP
		rowP = (rowP + stp) % wnd

		# Window fully revisited
		if (rowP = 0)
			# Doubles window and adjusts step
			wnd = 2 * wnd
			stp = sqrt + gap
			gap = -gap
		
			# Doubles sqrt every other iteration
			if (gap = -1)
				sqrt = 2 * sqrt
		
		# Synchronize point
		if (row0 = sync)
			sync = sync + (sqrt / 2)
			j = (j + 1) % P
			syncThreads()

	syncThreads()
	
	** Wandering phase: Iteratively overwrites pseudorandom cells of the memory matrix

	wnd = m_cost / (2 * P)
	sync = sqrt
	off0 = 0
	offP = wnd

	# Visitation Loop: (2 * m_cost * t_cost / P) rows revisited in pseudorandom fashion
	for wCount = 0 to ( ( (m_cost * t_cost) / P) - 1)
		# Picks pseudorandom rows and slices (j)
		row0 = off0 + (lsw(rand) % wnd)
		rowP = offP + (lsw( rand >>> omega ) % wnd)
		j = lsw( ( rand >>> omega ) >>> omega ) % P

		# Columns Loop: update M_i[row0]
		for col = 0 to C-1
			# Picks pseudorandom column	
			col0 = lsw( ( ( rand >>> omega ) >>> omega ) >>> omega ) % C

			rand = H_i.duplexing_{rho}( M_i[row0][col] [+] M_i[prev0][col0] [+] M_j[rowP][col], blen)
			M_i[row0][col] = M_i[row0][col] ^ rand

		# Next iteration revisits most recently updated rows
		prev0 = row0
		
		# Synchronize point
		if (wCount = sync)
			sync = sync + sqrt
			swap(off0,offP)
			syncThreads()

	syncThreads()

	** Wrap-up phase: output computation

	# Absorbs a final column with a full-round sponge
	H_i.absorb( M_i[row0][0] )

	# Squeezes outlen bits with a full-round sponge
	output_i = H_i.squeeze(outlen)

# Provides outlen-long bitstring as output
return output_0 ^ ... ^ output_{P-1}

Security analysis

Performance

The processing time obtained with a SSE single-core implementation of Lyra2 are illustrated in the hereby shown figure. This figure was extracted from, and is very similar of third-party benchmarks performed during the PHC context.

All tests were performed on an Intel Xeon E5-2430 (2.20 GHz with 12 Cores, 64 bits) equipped with 48 GB of DRAM, running Ubuntu 14.04 LTS 64 bits, and the source code was compiled using gcc 4.9.2.

References

External links
Lyra2's website
Lyra2 source code repository on Github

Key derivation functions